The 22855 / 56 Santragachi–Tirupati Express is a Superfast Express train belonging to Indian Railways East Coast Zone that runs between  and  in India.

It operates as train number 22855 from Santragachi to Tirupati and as train number 22856 in the reverse direction, serving the states of  West Bengal, Odisha & Andhra Pradesh.

Coaches
The 22855 / 56 Santragachi–Tirupati Express has one AC 2-tier, two AC 3-tier, eight sleeper class, six general unreserved & two SLR (seating with luggage rake) coaches. It does not carry a pantry car.

As is customary with most train services in India, coach composition may be amended at the discretion of Indian Railways depending on demand.

Service

As the average speed of the train is above , as per railway rules, its fare includes a Superfast surcharge.

Routing

Traction
As the route is electrified, a -based WAP-4 electric locomotive pulls the train to its destination.

References

External links
22855 Santragachi–Tirupati Express at India Rail Info
22856 Tirupati–Santragachi Express at India Rail Info

Express trains in India
Rail transport in Howrah
Rail transport in West Bengal
Rail transport in Odisha
Rail transport in Andhra Pradesh
Transport in Tirupati
Railway services introduced in 2011